Rush County Courthouse is a historic courthouse located at Rushville, Rush County, Indiana.  It was designed by the architectural firm of A. W. Rush & Sons of Grand Rapids, Michigan, and was built in 1896, and is a -story, steel frame building sheathed in rock faced stone in the Richardsonian Romanesque style. The irregularly shaped building has four towers at each end of the building with pyramidal roofs. It features a 196-foot tall clock tower with a pyramidal roof and conical turrets.

It was listed on the National Register of Historic Places in 1975.

References

External links

County courthouses in Indiana
Clock towers in Indiana
Courthouses on the National Register of Historic Places in Indiana
Romanesque Revival architecture in Indiana
Government buildings completed in 1896
Buildings and structures in Rush County, Indiana
National Register of Historic Places in Rush County, Indiana